Studio A is an hour-long live variety, comedy and sketch program produced as the RMITV Flagship production between 2008–2011 and was hosted by Dave Thornton  and then later Tommy Little. Supporting cast included many up and coming comedians and media personalities including Jess Harris (Twentysomething), Alison Bice, Karl Chandler, Tom Ballard, Tommy Dassalo, Oliver Clarke, Xavier Michaelidies, Teegan Higginbotham, Nick Cody, Nat Harris, Anne Edmonds, Ted Wilson, Luke McGregor and John Campbell. The show featured weekly celebrity guests and an array of Melbourne's up and coming talent. Guests included Peter Helliar, Colin Lane, Wayne Hope, Rove McManus, Adam Richard.

Awards 
Studio A took out two 2009 Antenna Awards for Outstanding Program of the Year and Outstanding Exterior Broadcast Program.

Rebranding of the RMITV Flagship 
After Season 6, RMITV stated in a press release that they would be making changes to their Flagship Production in 2012 and announced that Live on Bowen would be the show's successor. The press release stated that all current cast members of Studio A cast were welcome to audition but according to an article published on comedy.com.au, when asked if he would consider auditioning Little laughed at the idea.

Cast

References

External links 
 
 
 https://www.rmitv.org/portfolio-view/studio-a/

Television shows set in Victoria (Australia)
Australian community access television shows
English-language television shows
2008 Australian television series debuts
2011 Australian television series endings
RMITV flagship productions
RMITV productions